Finding John Christmas is a 2003 American made-for-television fantasy drama film that first aired on CBS. The film is a sequel to the 2001 television movie A Town Without Christmas.

Plot
When a photojournalist (David Cubitt) in the fictional Bay City photographs a mysterious stranger performing an act of bravery, the act quickly becomes headline news and the town dubs the stranger "John Christmas". After seeing the photo, Kathleen McAllister (Valerie Bertinelli) becomes convinced that the mysterious stranger is in fact her long-lost brother Hank (William Russ), a former firefighter. With the town's help, Kathleen and Noah set about to find the stranger's true identity with the help of Max (Peter Falk), a Christmas angel.

Filmed in Nova Scotia, Canada, the film featured a scene of a burning school based on the real Our Lady of the Angels School fire in Chicago, Illinois in 1958.

Cast
 Valerie Bertinelli.....Kathleen McAllister
 David Cubitt.....Noah Greeley
 Peter Falk.....Max
 William Russ.....Hank McAllister
 Jeremy Akerman.....Antonovitch
 David Calderisi.....Dr. Merkatz
 Patricia Gage.....Eleanor McAllister
 Michael Hirschbach.....Dr. Flynn
 Jennifer Pisana.....Soccoro Greeley
 Maria Ricossa.....Marcy Bernard

See also 
 List of Christmas films
 List of films about angels

References

External links
 Finding John Christmas at CBS.com
 
 

2003 television films
2003 films
American Christmas drama films
2000s fantasy drama films
Television sequel films
CBS network films
Films shot in Nova Scotia
Films directed by Andy Wolk
Films scored by Patrick Williams
Christmas television films
American drama television films
2000s English-language films
2000s American films